Bright Side (stylized in all caps) is a Cypriot YouTube channel operated by media publisher TheSoul Publishing. Founded in 2017, the channel uploads videos regarding how-to trivia as well as history and knowledge. , it is the 49th-most subscribed YouTube channel with over 43.2 million subscribers to its main channel, and over 9.76 billion views, The channel has over four thousand videos.

History
Bright Side was created on 15 March 2017, and posts videos that are a mix of “facts”, riddles and life hacks. Bright Side has been described as a "popular content farm channel".

In June 2019, Bright Side popularized a 382-day fast held in 1965 by Angus Barbieri, after creating an animated video recounting the event. The video received over 300,000 views within a week of its upload.

Its most popular video is called "13 Tips on How to Survive Wild Animal Attacks", which was created in late 2017. , the video has almost 90 million views.

The channel is operated by TheSoul Publishing, a company founded by Russian developers Pavel Radaev and Marat Mukhametov. The company owns 100+ channels including 5-Minute Crafts, 5-Minute Crafts Kids, 5-Minute Crafts Girly, 7-Second Riddles and 5-Minute Magic. In 2019, the company operated 40 Facebook pages in 10 languages and had 550 employees. In 2021 the company had 100 channel brands in 19 different languages, with a 2,100 member global workforce.

See also
 List of most-subscribed YouTube channels

References

External links
 
 

YouTube channels launched in 2017
TheSoul Publishing